Burias can refer to:

 Burias (island), Philippines
 Burias Pass, strait in the Philippines
 Buriaş, a village in Periş commune, Ilfov county, Romania
 Buriaš, a Kassite deity
 Burna-Buriash II, a king in the Kassite dynasty of Babylon
 Kadašman-Buriaš, a Babylonian governor
 USS Burias (AG-69), a U.S. Navy ship

See also
 Buria (disambiguation)